Jim Gérald (4 July 1889 – 2 July 1958) was a French actor.

Gérald was born Gérald Ernest Cuénod in Paris. He died in Paris in 1958.

Selected filmography

 La légende de soeur Béatrix (1923) - Un soudard
 The Imaginary Voyage (1926) - Auguste
 Le Bouif errant (1926) - Le colonel Bossouzof
 Captain Rascasse (1927)
 The Prey of the Wind (1927) - Docteur Massaski
 Éducation de prince (1928)
 The Italian Straw Hat (1928) - Beauperthuis
 Le chauffeur de Mademoiselle (1928) - Jim
 Les transatlantiques (1928) - Jérémie Shaw - le roi du cigare
 Two Timid Souls (1928) - Garadoux
 Le perroquet vert (1929) - Gordon
 Un soir au cocktail's bar (1929) - Barman #1
 Les taciturnes (1929) - Le père Brazec
 Father and Son (1929) - Tibots Rechtsanwalt
 The Night Is Ours (1930) - Barsac père
 Ça aussi!... c'est Paris (1930)
 The Son of the White Mountain (1930) - Desk Clerk
 L'Arlésienne (1930) - Marc, le patron
 La barcarolle d'amour (1930) - Directeur du théatre
 Les chevaliers de la montagne (1930) - Portier de l'hôtel
 Love Songs (1930)
 My Heart Incognito (1931) - Knox - l'imprésario américain
 La folle aventure (1931) - Jubine
 Laurette ou le Cachet rouge (1931) - Le capitaine du brick
 La chanson des nations (1931)
 The Unknown Singer (1931) - Ernest
My Aunt from Honfleur (1931) - Charles Berthier
 Sailor's Song (1932) - Marius
 Mon curé chez les riches (1932) - L'abbé Pellegrin
 L'amour en vitesse (1932) - Paul Fréderic Schmidt
 Honeymoon Trip (1933)
 Rocambole (1933)
 Rivaux de la piste (1933) - Spengler
 Le testament du Dr. Mabuse (1933) - Commissaire Lohmann
 Toto (1933) - Bruno
 The Constant Nymph (1933) - Trigorin
 Miss Helyett (1933) - Le professeur Smithson
 Mimosa Bar (1933)
 Le grillon du foyer (1933)
 Le Roi des Champs-Élysées (1933) - (uncredited)
 L'auberge du Petit-Dragon (1934) - Le père Michaud
 Le bossu (1934) - Cocardasse
 Un gosse pour 100.000 francs (1934) - César
 The Last Night (1934) - Mathias Krug
 The Man with a Broken Ear (1934) - Le capitaine des pompiers
 Monsieur Sans-Gêne (1935) - Monsieur Perrochin
 Les conquêtes de César (1935)
 Le roi des gangsters (1935)
 Le train d'amour (1936) - Martin
 Mister Flow (1936) - Le Cubain
 The Robber Symphony (1937) - Le charbonnier
 Bulldog Drummond at Bay (1937) - Veight
 Clothes and the Woman (1937) - Enrico Castigliani
 Titin des Martigues (1938) - Loulou les Gros Bras
 Légions d'honneur (1938) - Constant
 Ça... c'est du sport (1938) - Le directeur du cabaret
 La Rue sans joie (1938) - (uncredited)
 Trois artilleurs en vadrouille (1938) - Le père Dancourt
 Paix sur le Rhin (1938) - Grebs
 La boutique aux illusions (1939) - Le bonimenteur
 Farinet ou l'or dans la montagne (1939) - Wirt Crittin
 French Without Tears (1940) - Prof. Maingot
 Cristobal's Gold (1940) - Un pirate
 Gambling Hell (1942) - Un matelot
 Une vie de chien (1943) - Calumet
 Boule de suif (1945) - Le capitaine Von Kerfenstein
 The Faceless Enemy (1946) - Ramshow
 La troisième dalle (1946) - Le commissaire Plachon
 Le bateau à soupe (1946) - Le gouverneur
 Le secret du Florida (1947) - Dupont
 Les jeux sont faits (1947) - Renaudel
 Et dix de der (1948) - Smith
 To the Eyes of Memory (1948) - Le major
 La bataille du feu (1949) - M. Farjon
 Blonde (1950) - Le médecin
 Le gang des tractions-arrière (1950) - L'employé de banque
 Adventures of Captain Fabian (1951) - Commissioner Germain
 Dakota 308 (1951) - Van der Enden
 Pardon My French (1951) - Monsieur Poisson
 Take Me to Paris (1951) - Horse Butcher
 Dans la vie tout s'arrange (1952) - Monsieur Poisson
 Adieu Paris (1952)
 The Moment of Truth (1952) - Eddy - le patron du 'Zéro de conduite'
 Moulin Rouge (1952) - Le Père Cotelle (uncredited)
 Naked in the Wind (1953) - Oscar le borgne
 Au diable la vertu (1953) - L'agent de Rita Johnson
 Napoleon Road (1953) - Un membre du comité d'administration (uncredited)
 Le Guérisseur (1953) - Virolet, le rebouteux
 Les crimes de l'amour (1953) - Le père d'Albertine (segment 2 : 'Le rideau cramoisi')
 Daughters of Destiny (1954) - Le cocher / Le soldat (segment "Jeanne") (uncredited)
 Darling Anatole (1954) - Mme Anatole
 It's the Paris Life (1954) - L'Américain
 On Trial (1954) - Le professeur
 Father Brown (1954) - French Stationmaster
 The Barefoot Contessa (1954) - Mr. Blue
 La rafle est pour ce soir (1954) - M. Mongileux
 If Paris Were Told to Us (1956) - Un Cocher
 Marie Antoinette Queen of France (1956) - Un garde (uncredited)
 Foreign Intrigue (1956) - Bistro Owner
 Ces sacrées vacances (1956) - Le directeur du camp
 Les insoumises (1956) - Pére Hector
 Fernand cow-boy (1956) - Richardson
 Elena and Her Men (1956) - Le cafetier
  (1956) - Edouard Dubuisson
 Les lumières du soir (1956) - L'avocat Paul Flavier
 Honoré de Marseille (1956) - Le Roi des Ligures (uncredited)
 L'auberge en folie (1957)
 Fric-frac en dentelles (1957) - Caltier
 C'est une fille de Paname (1957)
 Le chômeur de Clochemerle (1957)
 Le souffle du désir (1958) - Jim
 Orders to Kill (1958) - François (uncredited)
 La môme aux boutons (1958)
 Dangerous Games (1958)
 Time Bomb (1959) - Drunk (final film role)

External links

http://www.allmovie.com/artist/jim-g%C3%A9rald-p26510

1889 births
1958 deaths
French male film actors
French male silent film actors
Male actors from Paris
20th-century French male actors
French expatriates in the United Kingdom